Mario Brega (25 March 1923  – 23 July 1994) was an Italian character actor. His heavy build meant that he regularly portrayed a thug in his films, particularly earlier in his career in westerns. Later in his career, however, he featured in numerous Italian comedy films.

Biography
Brega was born in Rome. He was a butcher before he drifted into acting, where his heavy physique ensured him a plethora of character roles. Debuting with director Dino Risi, he then played some minor roles in Sergio Leone's Spaghetti Western movies: A Fistful of Dollars, as Chico; For a Few Dollars More, as Niño; The Good, the Bad and the Ugly as Corporal Wallace; and also as a gangster in Once Upon a Time in America. He appeared in many other Spaghetti Westerns, including Death Rides a Horse, The Great Silence, and My Name is Nobody. Later in his career he had comical roles with director Carlo Verdone, such as in Un sacco bello and Talcum Powder.

He died of heart attack in Rome in 1994.

Filmography

 La mascotte dei diavoli blu (1947)
 L'uomo di paglia (1958) – Man who blocks Andrea davanti versus the driver (uncredited)
 Il mondo dei miracoli (1959) – Man with a black eye (uncredited)
 Gli scontenti (1961)
 Giorno per giorno disperatamente (1961)
 I motorizzati (1962) – Edoardo
 La marcia su Roma of Dino Risi (1962) – Mitraglia
 La parmigiana (1963) – Brega – policeman (uncredited)
 Uno strano tipo (1963)
 Le ore dell'amore (1963)
 Il Fornaretto di Venezia (1963)
 I mostri (episodio La nobile arte) (1963) – Rocchetti (segment "La nobile Arte")
 Se permettete parliamo di donne (1964)
 Due mafiosi nel Far West (1964) – Uomo con Rio
 A Fistful of Dollars (1964, by Sergio Leone) – Chico
 Diciottenni al sole (1964)
 Buffalo Bill, l'eroe del far west (1964) – Big Sam Donaldson 
 I complessi (1965) – (segment "Il complesso della schiava nubiana")
 For a Few Dollars More (1965, by Sergio Leone) – Nino (Indio's Gang)
 Un angelo per Satana (1966) – Carlo Lionesi
 El precio de un hombre (1966) – Miguel
 The Good, the Bad and the Ugly (1966, by Sergio Leone) – Cpl. Wallace
 Omicidio per appuntamento (1967) – Mario Galante
 No Diamonds for Ursula (1967) – Sansone
 Da uomo a uomo by Giulio Petroni (1967) – Walcott's Henchman in Waistcoat
 Hallelujah for Django (1967) – Andreas / Yanaro
 A Minute to Pray, a Second to Die (1968) – Krant 
 Il suo nome gridava vendetta (1968) – Dirty
 The Girl Who Couldn't Say No (1968) – Cripple
 Il Grande Silenzio by Sergio Corbucci (1968) – Martin
 A Noose for Django (1969) – Brandon's Partner
 Death Knocks Twice (1969) – Riccardo Beni
 La taglia è tua... l'uomo l'ammazzo io di Edoardo Mulargia (1969) – Tim
 Il divorzio (1970) – News-vendor
 New York-Parigi per una condanna a morte (1970)
 Cose di Cosa Nostra (1971) – Bellacque
 Se t'incontro t'ammazzo (1971) – Grendel
 Return of Sabata (1971) – Cameo (uncredited)
 In Prison Awaiting Trial (1971) – Detenuto amico di Scalia (uncredited)
 A Girl in Australia (1971) – Cameriere italiano a Brisbane (uncredited)
 Decameron No. 2 - Le altre novelle del Boccaccio di Mino Guerrini (1972) – Ferondo
 Sotto a chi Tocca! (1972) – Fregonese
 Le mille e una notte e un’altra ancora… (1973) – Vizier
 I racconti di Canterbury N. 2 (1973)
 Even Angels Eat Beans (1973) – Angelo's Weapon Master (uncredited)
 Da Scaramouche or se vuoi l'assoluzione baciar devi sto... cordone! (1973)
 Il mio nome è Nessuno (1973) – Pedro
 Basta con la guerra, facciamo l'amore (1974) – Garozzi
 Anche gli angeli tirano di destro (1974) – Barman
 I sette del gruppo selvaggio by Gianni Crea (1975) – Tornado
 Simone e Matteo, un gioco da ragazzi di Giuliano Carnimeo (1975) – Gang Member
 Due cuori, una cappella (1975) – Il macellaio
 Quant'è bella la Bernarda, tutta nera, tutta calda by Lucio Dandolo (1975) – Mirafiore (segment "Il Cavalier Mirafiore")
 Genio, due compari, un pollo, Un  (1975) – Officer at Fort
 Il conto è chiuso (1976) – Bobo Belmondo
 La banda del trucido (1977) – Questore Alberti
 Il gatto (1977) – killer
 Agonas horis telos (1978)
 Il giocattolo (1979) – Un rapinatore
 Un sacco bello di Carlo Verdone (1980) – Mario
 Bianco, rosso e Verdone by Carlo Verdone (1981) – The 'Prince'
 Una vacanza del cactus (1981) – Zio Michele, zio di Augusto
 Pierino la Peste alla riscossa (1982) – Giulio, padre di Pierino
 Borotalco by Carlo Verdone (1982) – Augusto
 Pè sempe (1982) – Don Enrico
 Occhio, malocchio, prezzemolo e finocchio (episodio Il mago) (1983) – Alberigo
 Vacanze di Natale (1983) – Arturo Marchetti
 Amarsi un po' (1984) – Augusto Coccia
 Sogni e bisogni (1984) – Er Policlinico
 Once Upon a Time in America by Sergio Leone (1984) – Mandy
 Troppo forte di Carlo Verdone (1986) – Sergio
 Asilo di polizia (1986) – Don Lombardi
 Montecarlo Gran Casinò (1987) – Luciano
 Crack (1991) – (final film role)

References

External links

1923 births
1994 deaths
20th-century Italian male actors
Male actors from Rome
Male Spaghetti Western actors
Male Western (genre) film actors
People of Lazian descent